Finn Alnæs (20 January 1932 – 3 November 1991) was a Norwegian novelist. He was born in Bærum. He made his literary debut with the novel Koloss (1963).

Alnæs was awarded the Norwegian Booksellers' Prize and the Norwegian Critics Prize for Literature in 1968 for the novel Gemini. Both his books Koloss and Gemini were nominated for the Nordic Council's Literature Prize, but did not win the prize.

Awards 
 Norwegian Booksellers' Prize 1968 
Norwegian Critics Prize for Literature 1968

References

1932 births
1991 deaths
Writers from Bærum
People educated at the Haagaas School
20th-century Norwegian novelists